The Port of Oroquieta or Oroquieta Port, is a seaport in Oroquieta City, Misamis Occidental, Philippines. Also known as Manuel L. Quezon Port and San Vicente Bajo Port. It is managed by Philippine Ports Authority - Port Management Office Misamis Occidental/Ozamiz. In September 2017, Roble Shipping made Oroquieta as its first port of call in Mindanao.

Shipping firms and destinations
Roble Shipping - Cebu

References

Oroquieta Port
Transportation in Mindanao